Salvia cardenasii is a rare and endangered perennial herb that is endemic to Bolivia, found in only three small populations, making it vulnerable to grazing animals and other damage. It grows on grassy slopes near rock outcrops, at approximately  elevation.

Notes

cardenasii
Flora of Bolivia